Sleeping Beauty is a 2011 Australian erotic drama film written and directed by Julia Leigh in her directorial debut. The film stars Emily Browning as a young university student. She takes up a part-time high-paying job with a mysterious group that caters to rich men who like the company of nude sleeping young women. Lucy is required to sleep alongside paying customers and be absolutely submissive to their erotic desires, fulfilling their fantasies by voluntarily entering into physical unconsciousness.

The film is based on influences that include Leigh's own dream experiences, and the novels The House of the Sleeping Beauties and Memories of My Melancholy Whores by Nobel laureates Yasunari Kawabata and Gabriel García Márquez, respectively.

The film premiered in May at the 2011 Cannes Film Festival as the first Competition entry to be screened. It was the first Australian film In Competition at Cannes since Moulin Rouge! (2001). Sleeping Beauty was released in Australia on 23 June 2011. It received a limited release in the United States on 2 December 2011. Overall critical reception of the film has been mixed, rising to some approval through June 2016, after circulation of the film on the festival circuit.

Plot
Lucy is a university student who works in an office in the daytime and at a restaurant in the evenings. She is occasionally a research subject at a science laboratory.

Lucy is paying tuition and rent by doing several jobs. Her sister's boyfriend is continually on her about her part of the rent. She is caring for Birdmann, who is an alcoholic and is very attracted to her. While she does not return his sexual interest, Lucy enjoys Birdmann's company, and in his presence is the only time she is shown smiling or laughing. An old joke between the two is that Birdmann frequently asks Lucy to marry him; Lucy always says no. Due to lack of money and Birdmann's addiction, Lucy makes a decision to look for another part-time job.

In response to a classified ad for yet another short-term job, Lucy meets Clara, who runs a service that combines lingerie modelling and catering performed by young women at a black tie dinner party for mostly male clients. Clara assures her that the men are not allowed to touch the women sexually, and Lucy agrees to try it. Clara inspects Lucy's body and names her "Sara" for the purpose of anonymity. At the dinner party, Lucy is the only girl dressed in white; the other women wear black lingerie that is much more revealing than Lucy's outfit.

After one other session as a serving girl, Lucy gets promoted. She receives a call from Clara's assistant for a different request. Lucy is driven to a country mansion, where Clara offers Lucy a new role wherein she will be voluntarily sedated and sleep naked while male clients lie beside her. They are permitted to caress and cuddle her, but vaginal penetration is not allowed. After Lucy falls asleep, she lies unconscious on the bed and Clara leads in her client. After Clara reminds the man of the no-penetration rule, he strips and curls up beside Lucy.

After a few of these sessions, Lucy has enough money to move into a larger, more expensive apartment, where she lives alone. She receives a call from Birdmann, who has overdosed on painkillers. She goes to his house and finds him dying in his bed. Sobbing, she takes off her shirt and gets in bed with him, but he dies in her arms. At Birdmann's funeral, Lucy abruptly asks an old boyfriend if he will marry her, in an echo of Birdmann's old playful banter. The ex-boyfriend, however, not understanding the reference, takes her seriously and, shocked, refuses her, citing a number of Lucy's personal problems as his reasons.

At her next assignment with Clara, Lucy asks if she can see what happens during the sessions while she is asleep. Clara refuses, saying it will put her clients at risk of blackmail. Lucy decides to surreptitiously film her next encounter. The client is once again the first man, but this time, he also drinks the tea with a much larger dose of the sleeping drug.

The following morning, Clara comes in and checks the man's pulse, showing no surprise when he cannot be awakened. Clara tries to wake Lucy, who has overdosed as well, and is eventually able to revive her using mouth-to-mouth resuscitation. Lucy begins screaming when she sees the dead man in bed next to her.

The film ends with the scene captured by the hidden camera: the dead old man and the sleeping girl both lying peacefully together in bed.

Cast

 Emily Browning as Lucy
 Rachael Blake as Clara
 Ewen Leslie as Birdmann
 Peter Carroll as Man 1
 Chris Haywood as Man 2
 Hugh Keays-Byrne as Man 3 
 Nathan Page as Businessman 2
 Sarah Snook as Flatmate
 Michael Dorman as Cook 
 Daniel Webber as Spy Shop Assistant

Production
Writer and director Julia Leigh, primarily a novelist, said in an interview with Filmmaker Magazine that she initially wrote the film without the intention of directing it. In writing the script, Leigh drew from several literary inspirations, including Yasunari Kawabata's House of the Sleeping Beauties and Memories of My Melancholy Whores by Gabriel García Márquez, as well as the eponymous fairytales by Charles Perrault and The Brothers Grimm, and the biblical story<ref name="slate" of an old King Solomon who had young virgins brought to him from all over his realm to sleep alongside him. She also noted the phenomenon of images of sleeping girls on some of the fetish websites. Kawabata's novel had been adapted in 2006 by German director Vadim Glowna, as Das Haus der Schlafenden Schönen (House of the Sleeping Beauties), but had been released to generally negative reviews.

The Sleeping Beauty script made the 2008 Black List of unproduced screenplays grabbing attention in Hollywood. In September 2009 the project was approved for funding from Screen Australia. In February 2010 it was announced that Emily Browning would play the lead role. Mia Wasikowska was originally cast as Lucy but she dropped out when offered the title role in an adaptation of Jane Eyre.

Filming 
Principal photography on the film began on 3 April 2010, at University of Sydney, Camperdown and downtown Sydney, New South Wales, Australia.

Emily Browning said she didn't have a problem with nudity, but she admitted the scene with the sadist character was unpleasant to film.

Reception
, the film holds a 48% approval rating on Rotten Tomatoes, based on 97 reviews with an average rating of 5.22/10. The website's critics consensus reads: "Sleeping Beautys provocative premise and luminous art design is hampered by a clinical, remote presentation, delivering boredom and shock in equal measure." On Metacritic, the film has a score of 57 out of 100, based on 20 "mixed or average reviews".

References

Further reading

External links

 
 

2010s erotic drama films
2011 directorial debut films
2011 drama films
2011 films
2011 independent films
Australian erotic drama films
Australian independent films
Australian nonlinear narrative films
2010s English-language films
Films about altered memories
Films about prostitution in Australia
Films about rape
Films based on Colombian novels
Films based on Japanese novels
Films based on multiple works
Films based on Sleeping Beauty
Films based on works by Gabriel García Márquez
Films based on works by Yasunari Kawabata
Films set in Sydney
Films set in the 22nd century
Films shot in Sydney
Screen Australia films